Plenty of Horn is the second album by saxophonist Paul Horn, released on the Dot label in 1958.

Reception

The Allmusic site awarded the album 3 stars stating: "Horn is in excellent form on the wide-ranging material which reflects the influence of Hamilton's chamber jazz approach but also contains some hard swinging".

Track listing
All compositions by Paul Horn except as indicated
 "Chloe" (Gus Kahn, Neil Moret) - 4:47
 "A Parable" - 4:07
 "Blues for Tom" - 3:57
 "The Smith Family" (Fred Katz) - 2:42
 "Romanze" (Katz) - 4:11
 "Yesterdays" (Jerome Kern, Otto Harbach) - 4:06
 "Moods for Horn" (Allyn Ferguson):
 "Effervescense" - 2:24
 "Reminescense" - 3:57
 "Exuberance" - 2:07
 "Ebullience" - 4:20
 "Tellin' the Truth" (Billy Bean) - 3:33
Recorded at Radio Recorders in Hollywood, CA on April 10, 1958 (tracks 1-6 & 8) and April 23, 1958 (track 7)

Personnel
Paul Horn - alto saxophone, flute, piccolo, alto flute, clarinet
Fred Katz - cello, piano
Larry Bunker - vibraphone, claves
Billy Bean - guitar
Red Mitchell - bass
Shelly Manne - drums
Ray Kramer - cello (tracks 1-6 & 8)
Mongo Santamaria - congas (tracks 1-6 & 8)
Ken Bright, Ed Leddy, Stu Williamson - trumpet (track 7) 
Vincent DeRosa, Dick Perissi - French horn (track 7) 
Red Callender - tuba (track 7)

References

Dot Records albums
Paul Horn (musician) albums
1958 albums